The Alp is a river in the Swiss canton of Schwyz and a tributary of the Sihl. The river rises on the northwestern flanks of the Brünnelistock and the northern flanks of the Kleiner and Grosser Mythen mountains near Brunni, and flows in generally northerly direction through the village of Alpthal, the village of Trachslau, the town of Einsiedeln and the village of Biberbrugg. At Biberbrugg, the river Biber joins the Alp.

The valley between Brunni and Einsiedeln is called Alptal.

External links

References

Rivers of the canton of Schwyz
Sihl
Rivers of Switzerland